Cherati is a district of Somali Region in Ethiopia.

References 

Districts of Somali Region